Crazy Love: Overwhelmed by a Relentless God is a 2008 New York Times bestselling Christian book written by Francis Chan and published by David C Cook. It is co-authored by Danae Yankoski with a foreword by Chris Tomlin. The book inspired the titular song for the album Crazy Love by Hawk Nelson and in 2009, won the  Retailers Choice Award for the best Christian Living book.

Summary 
Crazy Love deals with the idea of the average Christian's love of God and learning how to further develop those feelings into a "crazy, relentless, all-powerful love."

Reception 
Critical reception for Crazy Love has been positive, with Publishers Weekly praising the book. Challies.com wrote that Crazy Love was "a message that Christians desperately need to hear". Bookreporter.com stated that "while the writing throughout the book is simple and clear, his dynamic communication style does not translate fully to print" but that overall the book was "definitely worth reading".

References

External links 
 Crazy Love official website

Christian literature
2008 non-fiction books
2008 in Christianity